The Kosovo national under-19 football team is the national under-19 football team of Kosovo and is controlled by the Football Federation of Kosovo.

History

Permitting by FIFA to play friendlies
On 6 February 2013, FIFA gave the permission to play international friendly games against other member associations. Whereas, on 13 January 2014, there was a change of this permit that forbade Kosovo to play against the national teams of the countries of the former Yugoslavia. Club teams were also allowed to play friendlies and this happened after a FIFA Emergency Committee meeting. However, it was stipulated that clubs and representative teams of the Football Federation of Kosovo may not display national symbols as flags, emblems, etc. or play national anthems. The go-ahead was given after meetings between the Football Association of Serbia and Sepp Blatter.

Membership in UEFA and FIFA

In September 2015 at an UEFA Executive Committee meeting in Malta was approved the request from the federation to the admission in UEFA to the next Ordinary Congress to be held in Budapest. On 3 May 2016, at the Ordinary Congress. Kosovo were accepted into UEFA after members voted 28–24 in favor of Kosovo. Ten days later, Kosovo was accepted in FIFA during their 66th congress in Mexico with 141 votes in favour and 23 against.

Competition records

UEFA European Championship

Fixtures and results

2021

2022

Players

Current squad
 The following players were called up for the 2023 UEFA European Under-19 Championship qualification matches.
 Match dates: 17, 20 and 23 November 2022
 Caps and goals correct as of:''' 28 March 2022, after the match against .

Recent call-ups
The following players have been called up for the team within the last 12 months and are still available for selection.

Coaching staff

See also
Men's
National team
Under-21
Under-17
Under-15
Futsal
Women's
National team
Under-19
Under-17

Notes and references

Notes

References

External links
 
Kosovo U19 News about the team

U
European national under-19 association football teams